Asja Paladin (born 27 September 1994) is an Italian former professional racing cyclist, who rode professionally between 2013 and 2020 for the ,  and  teams. Her sister Soraya Paladin is also a professional cyclist.

Major results
2018
1st  Mountains classification Emakumeen Euskal Bira

See also
 Top Girls Fassa Bortolo

References

External links
 

1994 births
Living people
Italian female cyclists
Place of birth missing (living people)
Sportspeople from Treviso
Cyclists from the Province of Treviso